Aivo Udras (born 15 March 1970) is an Estonian biathlete. He competed at the 1992 Winter Olympics and the 1994 Winter Olympics.

References

External links
 
 
 

1970 births
Living people
Estonian male biathletes
Olympic biathletes of Estonia
Biathletes at the 1992 Winter Olympics
Biathletes at the 1994 Winter Olympics
Sportspeople from Võru